This is a list of filesystems with support for filesystem-level encryption. Not to be confused with full-disk encryption.

General-purpose filesystems with encryption
 AdvFS on Digital Tru64 UNIX
 Novell Storage Services on Novell NetWare and Linux
 NTFS with Encrypting File System (EFS) for Microsoft Windows
 ZFS since Pool Version 30
 Ext4, added in Linux kernel 4.1 in June 2015
 F2FS, added in Linux 4.2
 APFS, macOS High Sierra (10.13) and later.

Cryptographic filesystems

FUSE-based file systems

Integrated into the Linux kernel
 eCryptfs
 Rubberhose filesystem (discontinued)
 StegFS (discontinued)

Integrated into other UNIXes
 PEFS (Private Encrypted File System) on FreeBSD
 geli on FreeBSD
 EFS (Encrypted File System) on AIX

See also
 Comparison of disk encryption software

References

Computing-related lists
Disk encryption
File systems